The 24th Tactical Missile Squadron is an inactive United States Air Force unit.  It was last active as the 74th Air Defense Missile Squadron assigned to the 23d Air Division of Aerospace Defense Command, stationed near Duluth Municipal Airport, Minnesota, where it was inactivated in 1972.  The squadron's earliest predecessor was active early in World War II as an antisubmarine unit in the Caribbean and Europe until its mission was transferred to the United States Navy.  During the Cold War it was a training unit for Matador cruise missiles.  Its most recently active predecessor was an air defense missile squadron in the northern United States from 1960 to 1972.

History

World War II Antisubmarine Operations

The squadron was first activated as the 40th Bombardment Squadron (Medium) in early 1941 as one of the four squadrons of the 13th Bombardment Group, an element of First Air Force, equipped with B-18 Bolos at Langley Field, Virginia.

After the United States entered World War II the group was ordered to search for German U-boats and to fly aerial coverage of friendly convoys off the northeast Atlantic, protecting the Boston and New York City shipping lanes.  The squadron deployed to Guantanamo Bay Naval Base, Cuba and was attached to the Caribbean Sea Frontier of the United States Navy to patrol northern Caribbean waters, then to airfields in Jamaica, Trinidad and Surinam during 1942, flying antisubmarine missions.

The squadron was redesignated as the 4th Antisubmarine Squadron and was assigned to the 25th Antisubmarine Wing of the Army Air Forces Antisubmarine Command in November 1942, when the 13th Group was inactivated and returned to Mitchel Field, New York before being reassigned to RCAF Station Gander, Newfoundland, flying antisubmarine patrols over the Grand Banks of Newfoundland and North Atlantic shipping lanes performing convoy escort patrols.

The squadron moved to southwestern England in June 1943 and was reassigned to 479th Antisubmarine Group in July.   It flew killer hunts against German U-boats in the Bay of Biscay off the western coast of France from Brest south to the Spanish border.   Along this part of the occupied French coast were major Kriegsmarine U-boat bases at Brest, Lorient, Saint-Nazaire, La Rochelle (La Pallice) and Bordeaux.  The squadron's air echelon inactivated in late October 1943 with its aircraft being reassigned to the United States Navy after the inactivation of AAF Antisubmarine Command.    Squadron personnel were reassigned to Eighth Air Force units as replacement personnel.

Cold War Tactical Missile Training

The squadron was activated for a second time on 15 March 1957 as the 24th Tactical Missile Squadron and assigned to Ninth Air Force's 589th Tactical Missile Group (TMG).  It trained for operation of TM-61 Matador tactical cruise missiles at Orlando AFB.  When the 17th Tactical Missile Squadron deployed to Taiwan in April 1958, the 24th was transferred to the 588th TMG.  It engaged in crew training with the 589th but never received any missiles or deployment orders before inactivating.

The 24th and 588th TMG were programmed to deploy to South Korea during the fall of 1958, but instead, the unit was inactivated on 15 July 1958. The personnel and equipment of the 588th were reassigned to the newly formed 58th Tactical Missile Group at Osan AB, South Korea, while the 310th Fighter-Bomber Squadron at Osan gave up its F-86 Sabres and became the 310th Tactical Missile Squadron, becoming a Matador squadron and absorbing the personnel of the 588th TMG en masse.

Cold War Air Defense
The squadron was activated for the third time on 1 April 1960 as the 74th Air Defense Missile Squadron at Duluth Municipal Airport.  It stood alert during the Cold War, with IM-99A (later CIM-10) BOMARC surface to air antiaircraft missiles.   The squadron was tied into a Semi-Automatic Ground Environment (SAGE) direction center which could use analog computers to process information from ground radars, picket ships and airborne aircraft to accelerate the display of tracking data at the direction center to quickly direct the missile site to engage hostile aircraft.    It was inactivated on 30 April 1972.

Although geographically separated from the base, it was an off base facility of Duluth MAP and the squadron received administrative and logistical support from the military facilities at Duluth Airport.

Consolidation
The 40th Bombardment Squadron and the 74th Air Defense Missile Squadron were consolidated with the 24th Tactical Missile Squadron on 19 September 1985, while remaining in inactive status.

Lineage
4th Antisubmarine Squadron
 Constituted as the 40th Bombardment Squadron (Medium) on 20 November 1940
 Activated on 15 January 1941
 Redesignated as the 4th Antisubmarine Squadron (Heavy) on 29 November 1942
 Disbanded on 11 November 1943
 Consolidated with the 24th Tactical Missile Squadron and the 74th Air Defense Missile Squadron as the 24th Tactical Missile Squadron on 19 September 1985

74th Air Defense Missile Squadron
 Constituted as the 74th Air Defense Missile Squadron (BOMARC) on 17 December 1959
 Activated on 1 April 1960
 Inactivated on 30 April 1972
 Consolidated with the 40th Bombardment Squadron and the 24th Tactical Missile Squadron as the 24th Tactical Missile Squadron on 19 September 1985

24th Tactical Missile Squadron
 Constituted as the 24th Tactical Missile Squadron on 9 November 1956
 Activated on 15 March 1957
 Inactivated on 15 July 1958
 Consolidated with the 40th Bombardment Squadron and the 74th Air Defense Missile Squadron on 19 September 1985

Assignments
 13th Bombardment Group, 15 January 1941 (air echelon attached to US Navy Caribbean Sea Frontier, 30 August 1942 - 9 October 1942 and 16 October 1942 - 15 November 1942 and to 99th Bombardment Squadron 9 October 1942 - 16 October 1942)
 25th Antisubmarine Wing, 30 November 1942
 Army Air Forces Antisubmarine Command, 8 June 1943
 479th Antisubmarine Group, 8 July 1943 - 11 November 1943
 589th Tactical Missile Group, 15 March 1957
 588th Tactical Missile Group, April 1958 - 15 July 1958
 Duluth Air Defense Sector, 1 April 1960
 29th Air Division, 1 April 1966
 23d Air Division, 19 November 1969 - 30 April 1972

Stations
 Langley Field, Virginia, 15 January 1941
 Orlando Army Air Base, Florida, 7 June 1941
 Westover Field, Massachusetts, 22 January 1942
 Langley Field, Virginia, 16 June 1942 - ca. 6 June 1942
 Mitchel Field, New York, 3 August 1942 (part of air echelon operated from Guantanamo, Cuba 30 August 1942, Vernam Field, Jamaica, 14 September 1942, Edinburgh Field, Trinidad, 6 October 1942, Zanderij Field, Surinam, 9 October 1942. Edinburgh Field, Trinidad, 16 October 1942 - 15 November 1942)
 Gander Airport, Newfoundland, ca. 8 June 1942 -23 June 1943
 RAF St Eval, England, 30 June 1943
 RAF Dunkeswell, England, 6 August 1943
 Poddington, England, November 1943 - 11 November 1943
 Orlando Air Force Base, Florida, 15 March 1957 - 15 July 1958
 Duluth Municipal Airport, 1 April 1960 - 30 April 1972

Awards and campaigns

Aircraft and Missiles
 B-18 Bolo, 1941–1943
 B-24 Liberator, 1943.
 TM-61 Matador (authorized, but not equipped)
 IM-99A (later CIM-10) BOMARC, 1960-1972

See also
 List of United States Air Force missile squadrons

References

Notes

Bibliography

 
 
 
 

Further Reading
 

024
Military units and formations established in 1941
1941 establishments in Virginia